The 1966 Richmond Spiders football team was an American football team that represented the University of Richmond as a member of the Southern Conference (SoCon) during the 1966 NCAA University Division football season. In their first season under head coach Frank Jones, Richmond compiled a 2–8 record, with a mark of 2–4 in conference play, finishing in seventh place in the SoCon.

Schedule

References

Richmond
Richmond Spiders football seasons
Richmond Spiders football